The Gallery Press is an independent Irish publishing company, publishing Irish poetry, drama and prose by contemporary Irish writers.

History
Gallery Press began publishing with its first release on 6 February 1970. Peter Fallon founded the press when he was eighteen years old and has been the editor since the press's formation. The press operates out of a small, 19th-century stone house and its adjacent outbuildings, in the centre of North Meath. It has been described as the "leading poetry publisher in the Irish Republic".

Notable writers published by the press

Sara Berkeley
Ciaran Carson
Michael Coady
Gerald Dawe
Eamon Grennan
Vona Groarke
Brian Friel
Kerry Hardie
Michael Hartnett
Seamus Heaney
Pearse Hutchinson
Michael Longley
Medbh McGuckian
Derek Mahon
John Montague 
Eiléan Ní Chuilleanáin

References

External links
 

Irish companies established in 1970
Irish poetry
Poetry publishers
Publishing companies established in 1970
Publishing companies of Ireland
Literary publishing companies
Book publishing companies of Ireland